The Falperra International Hill Climb, is an annual automobile hillclimb to the summit of Falperra in Braga, Portugal. The track measures , climbing  from the start at km 39 on EN 309 Highway, to the finish at km 44,20, on grades averaging 5%.

The race is on the FIA European Hill Climb Championship Events Calendar and features on both Portugal and Spain National Hill Climb Championships. It has taken place since 1927, being the most popular Hill Climb race in Portugal, with 200.000 spectators per edition. It is currently contested by a variety of classes of cars, (touring cars, sportscars, single-seaters) and has on average 250 competitors.

History
The first running of the Falperra Hill Climb was promoted by a local commission from Braga in 1927. The second edition has held in 1930 by the Automóvel Clube de Portugal, ACP (Portugal Automobile Association).

The competition was resumed in 1950 by the ACP, who named the 1950 edition as Falperra First Hill Climb, and all editions are accounted from 1950 edition.

In 1976, the Automóvel Clube do Minho (Minho Automobile Association) assumed the organization of the race and applied for an international competition. FIA integrated the race in their European Championship in 1978. Since that year, all the Falperra Hill Climbs where part of a FIA international calendar with the exception of the first race of 1984 (in this year there were two races: one in May for the national championship, and another in September for the European Championship).

In 2002, due to lack of understanding between local authorities to make security improvements at the track, the race was not realized until 2010, when that improvements were made.

In 2013 the race was in risk of not being held, but due to the pressure made by the Falperra HC supporters in social networks, the Braga city hall made the new pack of safety improvements requested by FIA in the same year.

Falperra International Hill Climb was chosen by FIA to receive the FIA Hill Climb Masters in 2020. Due to Covid–19 pandemic concerns, the event was postponed to 2021. The track was shortened to 2970 m just for the Masters.

Current records
The current record was set in 2019 by the Italian driver Christian Merli, on the wheel of an Osella FA 30, with the time of 1:44.955, beating the record established by himself in the previous year.

Winners

 — Cumulative time of the 2 best heats.
 — The principal contestants from European Championship withdrew due to heavy rain.
 — The edition of 2021 received the FIA Hill Climb Masters and the track was shortened to 2970m.

See also
 European Hill Climb Championship
 Hillclimbing
 Mont Ventoux Hill Climb
 Pikes Peak International Hill Climb

References

External links
 Website about Czech and European hill climbs
 Most complete European Hill Climb Championship race results 1957-today

Hillclimbing
Hill climb
1927 establishments in Portugal